Calliotropis lateumbilicata is a species of sea snail, a marine gastropod mollusk in the family Eucyclidae.

Description
The shell reaches a height of 14 mm.

Distribution
This species occurs in Antarctic waters.

References

 Dell, R. K. (1990). Antarctic Mollusca with special reference to the fauna of the Ross Sea. Bulletin of the Royal Society of New Zealand, Wellington 27: 1–311

External links

lateumbilicata
Gastropods described in 1990